Cefetamet is a cephalosporin antibiotic.

References 

Cephalosporin antibiotics
Thiazoles
Ketoximes